Mount Franklin is a mountain in Coös County, New Hampshire, United States. The mountain is named after Benjamin Franklin and is part of the Presidential Range of the White Mountains. Note that Ben Franklin was not a president. Mount Franklin is flanked to the northeast by Mount Monroe, and to the southwest by Mount Eisenhower.

Mount Franklin drains on the northwest side into the Ammonoosuc River, thence into the Connecticut River and into Long Island Sound in Connecticut. On the southeast side, Franklin drains into the Dry River, thence into the Saco River, and into the Gulf of Maine in Maine.

The Appalachian Trail, a  National Scenic Trail from Georgia to Maine, crosses Mount Franklin as it traverses the main ridge of the Presidentials from Crawford Notch to the summit of Mount Washington. Franklin stands on the northwest side of the Dry River Wilderness.

See also

 List of mountains in New Hampshire
 White Mountain National Forest

References

External links
 

Mountains of New Hampshire
White Mountains (New Hampshire)
Mountains of Coös County, New Hampshire